Ceroxys urticae is a species of picture-winged fly in the genus Ceroxys of the family Ulidiidae
found in most of Europe. It can also be found in Egypt, Iran, Israel, Kazakhstan, Kyrgyzstan, Mongolia, Saudi Arabia, Turkmenistan, and Uzbekistan. Plants this fly lives on include alfalfa, the true grasses (Poaceae), Egyptian clover (Trifolium alexandrinum
L.) and wild sugarcane.

Gallery

References

External links
Images representing  Ceroxys urticae at BOLD

urticae
Flies described in 1758
Muscomorph flies of Europe
Taxa named by Carl Linnaeus
Diptera of Asia